Ansonia High School is a public four-year high school located in Ansonia, Connecticut. It has approximately 513 students in grades 9 through 12. About 31.6 percent of the student body is Caucasian; 68.4 percent is minority. The school is accredited by the New England Association of Colleges and Secondary Schools, and the Connecticut State Department of Education.

Facilities
Ansonia High School was originally located on the east side of the Naugatuck River, at the foot of Prospect Street, near the intersection of North and South Cliff Street. Today, the lot serves as a small park and playground. The building burned in a massive fire on February 23, 1939. According to the Evening Sentinel, the building was being used for eighth and ninth grade at the time of the fire, and served 590 students.  The fire started in the basement and ten were injured while fighting it.

The original building was erected in 1880. A new high school was opened in 1937, located on Howard Avenue on the west side of the Naugatuck River. This was relocated to the east side, where a new building opened in 1999. The previous building became the new Ansonia Middle School.

The school has 79 employees and have an average of 13.9 years of experience. 80 percent have a master's degree and 42 percent trained for the Beginning Educator Support and Training (BEST) program as mentors, assessors, or cooperating teachers.  The school year contains two semesters and four marking periods. The minimum passing grade for the school is a 60.

Sports
In the mid-1970s, the high school adopted the "Chargers" as its mascot.

Ansonia is part of the Naugatuck Valley League

The football team has won the Walter Camp Football Foundation's Joseph W. Kelly Trophy - awarded to Connecticut's top football team - in '83, '89, '05, '06, '07, and '13.

It has placed boys in the all-star basketball team for the state.  The boys' football team has also produced players who have been recruited for colleges.

Notable alumni 

 Richard A. Brualdi
 John Cooke
 Priscilla Garita
 Shirlee Taylor Haizlip
 Samuel Jaskilka, Class of 1937
 Treat Baldwin Johnson
 Sandy Osiecki
 Ramondo Stallings

See also 

 List of high school football rivalries more than 100 years old
 List of high schools in Connecticut

References

External links
 

High School
Public high schools in Connecticut
Schools in New Haven County, Connecticut